Robinson Armament Co. is a firearms manufacturer based in North Salt Lake, Utah, United States.

As of 2009, it employed 15 people. The company manufactures military-style semi-automatic rifles, including the XCR Modular Rifle. 

The company has been outspoken against federal gun regulations.

See also
Robinson Armament XCR
Robinson Armament M96 Expeditionary

Notes

External links
Robinson Arm website

Firearm manufacturers of the United States
Manufacturing companies based in Utah